Frederick's of Hollywood is an American lingerie brand formerly with stores in shopping malls across the United States. In 2015, all 111 retail stores were closed in advance of a bankruptcy filing. The brand was acquired by Authentic Brands Group and was relaunched as an online-only store, FOH Online Corp. In 2018, Naked Brand Group, Inc. acquired FOH Online Corp.

History and operations
The business was started by Frederick Mellinger (inventor of the push-up bra) in 1947. Frederick's sold bras, panties, corsets, bedroom slippers, a vast array of hosiery, bridal lingerie, special occasion lingerie, and more. The original flagship store was a landmark on Hollywood Boulevard in Hollywood, California. In September 2005, after 59 years, the store moved near the corner of Hollywood Boulevard and Highland Avenue.

The store previously housed The Lingerie Museum featuring The Celebrity Lingerie Hall of Fame, which exhibited a collection of underwear worn by Hollywood movie stars, such as one of Madonna's pointy-breasted corsets.

Frederick's of Hollywood was the market leader in lingerie until the 1980s, when it was overtaken by Victoria's Secret.

In 1992, Frederick's lingerie museum drew national media attention when it was looted during the Los Angeles riots. Madonna’s black bustier, which was worn in her music video for Open Your Heart, was stolen and has never been returned despite a $1,000 reward from Frederick’s. Madonna gave the museum a replacement in exchange for a $10,000 donation to an organization that supplied free mammograms to the poor. Other lingeries stolen in the store were Ava Gardner's bloomers and a push-up bra worn by actress Katey Sagal in Married... with Children. One repentant looter delivered a bag of Gardner's and Sagal's lingeries to the pastor at nearby Blessed Sacrament Catholic Church, Hollywood. An Austin newspaper noted that Blessed Sacrament's pastor "may be the only priest in America to ever comfort a man who felt guilty about stealing celebrity bloomers." In an article titled "Support Is Generous for Bra Museum", the St. Louis Post-Dispatch noted that such an "uplifting story could only happen in Hollywood."

Some of the lingerie worn by the iconic 1950s pin-up Bettie Page was from Frederick's of Hollywood.

The company filed for Chapter 11 bankruptcy in 2001.  In 2003, it emerged from bankruptcy and was headquartered in Los Angeles.  In 2006, it merged with New York City sleepwear manufacturer Movie Star and the headquarters was moved to New York.   In 2008, the company changed its name to Frederick's of Hollywood Group Inc.  The company was traded on the American Stock Exchange under the ticker symbol FOHL, but in May 2014, the company was taken private by Harbinger Group and other investors. Its headquarters remain in New York City.

In 2015, the company closed its stores and again filed for Chapter 11 bankruptcy. Its brand and online operations were acquired by Authentic Brands Group. The company announced it would be online only, with possible future plans to create products for sale in department stores and other retail outlets.

In 2018, the company's online operations were acquired by the Naked Brand Group Inc.

Notes

External links
 
 Frederick's of Hollywood Lingerie: A History—Internet Archive
 1977 Frederick's of Hollywood catalog—Internet Archive

1947 establishments in California
Clothing retailers of the United States
Companies based in New York City
Hollywood Boulevard
Defunct organizations based in Hollywood, Los Angeles
Lingerie brands
Clothing companies established in 1947
Retail companies established in 1947
Companies that filed for Chapter 11 bankruptcy in 2001
Companies that filed for Chapter 11 bankruptcy in 2015
2015 mergers and acquisitions
Authentic Brands Group